{{Infobox election
| election_name = 2004 United States Senate election in Arizona
| country = Arizona
| type = presidential
| ongoing = no
| previous_election = 1998 United States Senate election in Arizona
| previous_year = 1998
| next_election = 2010 United States Senate election in Arizona
| next_year = 2010
| election_date = November 2, 2004
| image_size = 125px
| image1 = John McCain official portrait with alternative background.jpg
| nominee1 = John McCain
| party1 = Republican Party (United States)
| popular_vote1 = 1,505,372
| percentage1 = 76.7%
| image2 = 3x4.svg
| nominee2 = Stuart Starky
| party2 = Democratic Party (United States)
| popular_vote2 = 404,507
| percentage2 = 20.6%
| map_image = 2004 United States Senate election in Arizona results map by county.svg
| map_size = 210px
| map_caption = County results McCain:   
| title = U.S. Senator
| before_election = John McCain
| before_party = Republican Party (United States)
| after_election = John McCain
| after_party = Republican Party (United States)
}}

The 2004 United States Senate election in Arizona' took place on November 2, 2004 alongside other elections to the United States Senate in other states as well as elections to the United States House of Representatives and various state and local elections. Incumbent Republican U.S. Senator John McCain won re-election to a fourth term with his largest victory as a U.S. senator. , this was the last time the counties of Apache and Santa Cruz voted for the Republican candidate. 

 General election 
Candidates
 Ernest Hancock (Libertarian)
 John McCain, incumbent U.S. Senator (Republican)
 Stuart Starky, teacher (Democratic)

Campaign
Since 1998, McCain had an eventful third term. He challenged Texas Governor George W. Bush in the Presidential primary and despite winning the New Hampshire primary, he lost the nomination. Solidifying his image as a maverick, he voted against the Bush tax cuts. He supported limits on stem cell research. He had a lopsided favorable ratings of 39% to 9% unfavorable in the most recent The New York Times/CBS News poll.

Stuart Starky, an eighth-grade teacher in South Phoenix, was widely known as a long-shot challenger. Starky stated that "I truly believe he's going to run for president again." Starky was called by The Arizona Republic'' a "sacrificial lamb" put on ballot because there were no chances to beat McCain. During his campaign, he debated McCain twice, once in Tucson and once in Flagstaff. He was also featured on the cover of Teacher Magazine, dubbed the "Unsinkable Stu Starky." Starky was defeated in a landslide. Despite the relatively low percentage, he gained the highest vote per dollar amount in the country, spending only about $15,000 for his campaign (Starky's campaign may have been aided by John Kerry running for president).
 Complete video of debate, October 15, 2004

Predictions

Results

By county

See also 
 2004 United States Senate elections

References 

2004 Arizona elections
Arizona
2004
John McCain